Barastu (also Romanized as Barastū; also known as Parastū) is a village in Milanlu Rural District, in the Central District of Esfarayen County, North Khorasan Province, Iran. At the 2006 census, its population was 89, in 16 families.

References 

Populated places in Esfarayen County